Kingswood Elementary School may refer to:

Kingswood Elementary School (British Columbia), an elementary school in Richmond, BC
Kingswood Elementary School (Nova Scotia), an elementary school in Hammonds Plains, NS